Parkettes National Gymnastics Training Center, or Parkettes for short, is a gymnastics club located in Allentown, Pennsylvania that had its beginnings in the early 1960s with a middle school gymnastics program in Allentown that gradually grew into an intramural program and then into a facility that has produced several teams and individual gymnasts representing the United States, the Czech Republic, and Canada in international meets, including the Olympic Games. The husband and wife team Bill Strauss and Donna Strauss have served as the head coaches at Parkettes since its inception.

History 
In 1986, Parkettes's gymnasts took the 1st (Jennifer Sey), 2nd (Hope Spivey), and 4th (Alyssa Solomon) places at the United States National Gymnastics Championships.

At the 1988 Olympic Games, Parkettes-trained gymnast Hope Spivey represented the United States.

In 1992, Parkettes' gymnast Kim Kelly caused a considerable controversy in that after she was selected for the 1992 Olympic gymnastics training squad, she was then not selected for the competition team extremely close to the opening of the games in Barcelona.

In 1998 and 1999, Kristen Maloney won the United States National Senior All-Around gold. In 2000, she competed at the Olympics in Sydney, winning a bronze medal.

Kristal Uzelac won the United States Junior National All-Around gold in 1999, 2000, and 2001.

In 2002, Vanessa Meloche, a Canadian gymnast at Parkettes, finished third at the Canadian championships and first on the uneven bars.

In 2022, 11 Parkettes' gymnasts made misconduct complaints to the United States Center for SafeSport that resulted in an ongoing investigation of five Parkettes coaches.

Media coverage
In 2003, CNN aired a documentary, Achieving the Perfect 10, which contained some criticisms of the demanding and competitive nature of Parkettes's training program.  In 2008, Jennifer Sey, the 1986 National Champion from Parkettes, published a book, Chalked Up, which was critical of Parkettes and elite gymnastics.

Notable alumni
Christina Desiderio
 2016 Olympic Trials competitor
 LSU Tigers gymnastics
 2019 NCAA team silver medalist

Margzetta Frazier
 2018 Birmingham World Cup silver medalist
 UCLA Bruins gymnastics
 2019 NCAA team bronze medalist

Kristen Maloney
 2000 Olympic Team Bronze Medalist
 1996 Pacific Rim Team champion
 1998 Pacific Rim Team and All-Around champion, Balance Beam bronze medalist
 1998 & 1999 US National Champion
 UCLA Bruins gymnastics
 2001 NCAA Team champion, Balance Beam bronze medalist
 2004 NCAA Team champion, Uneven Bars silver medalist
 2005 NCAA Vault and Balance Beam champion, All-Around silver medalist

Vanessa Meloche
 2002 Commonwealth Games Team, Vault, and Uneven Bars bronze medalist
 2002 Canadian uneven bars champion

Elizabeth Price
 2012 U.S Olympic team alternate
 2013 U.S World Championships team alternate
 2014 American Cup champion
 2014 Pacific Rim All Around, Team, Floor Exercise, & Uneven Bars champion
 Stanford Cardinal gymnastics
 2015 NCAA Vault champion
 2018 NCAA Uneven Bars champion and All-Around bronze medalist

Jennifer Sey
 1985 World Championships team member
 1986 US National Champion

Kristal Uzelac
 1999, 2000, & 2001 Junior US National Champion

References

External links
 

Gymnastics organizations
Gymnastics clubs
Gymnastics clubs in the United States
Sports venues in Allentown, Pennsylvania